Marshall Paul Plummer (February 25, 1948 – March 25, 2010) was the first Navajo Nation Vice President, serving from 1991 to 1995. He died on March 25, 2010 having been diagnosed with end-stage lung disease. He was mentioned in an article in the Farmington Daily Times.

References

1948 births
2010 deaths
Vice Presidents of the Navajo Nation
People from Farmington, New Mexico
Deaths from lung disease
20th-century Native Americans
21st-century Native Americans